Hagen Schulte (born 11 January 1993 in Christchurch, New Zealand) is a rugby union player who currently plays for the Utah Warriors in Major League Rugby (MLR).
Schulte usually plays as a fly-half but can also cover fullback. He previously played for Glasgow Warriors.

Born in New Zealand, Schulte was Scottish qualified to represent Scotland rugby because his grandmother is Scottish. He was also German qualified to play with the Germany national rugby union team, which later prompted a move to Germany.

Rugby Union career

Amateur career

He formerly played for Marist Albion in Christchurch, New Zealand. He was top scorer in the Canterbury league before signing for the Warriors.

He also played for Canterbury at age grades.

He played for Buller province in 2015.

When not playing for Glasgow Warriors, his contract allows him to play for amateur club Glasgow Hawks.

Schulte left Scotland for the 2017-18 season to play in Germany for Heidelberger RK in the Rugby-Bundesliga.

Professional career

He trained with Glasgow Warriors in March 2016 before signing for the 2016–17 season. Schulte said on signing: "Following my trial last season, all has worked out and I’m delighted to sign for Glasgow Warriors. I try and pride myself on a running and kicking game. Coming over here and training couldn’t be more exciting."

Schulte made his debut for the Warriors in the pre-season match against Harlequins on the 20 August 2016.

He made his competitive debut for Glasgow in the Pro12 match against Scarlets on 10 February 2017.

On 4 May 2017 it was announced that Schulte would leave the club at the end of the season.

International career

In November 2017 Schulte was called up to the Germany national team for their Autumn internationals. He made his debut against the USA national side on 18 November 2017 at Full Back.

References

External links
 
 
 
 
Hagen Schulte at Ultimaterugby.com

Living people
German rugby union players
Germany international rugby union players
New Zealand rugby union players
German people of New Zealand descent
German people of Scottish descent
New Zealand people of German descent
New Zealand people of Scottish descent
Glasgow Warriors players
Glasgow Hawks players
1992 births
Heidelberger RK players
Expatriate rugby union players in Scotland
New Zealand expatriate sportspeople in Scotland
Rugby union fly-halves
Rugby union fullbacks
Utah Warriors players
Rugby union players from Christchurch